Rockey is a given name and surname. Notable people with the name include:

Given name
Rockey Felker (born 1953), former quarterback, head football coach, currently director of player personnel for Mississippi State University
John Rockey Park (1833–1900), prominent educator in the Territory and State of Utah
Rockey Vaccarella, resident of St. Bernard Parish, Louisiana and a Hurricane Katrina survivor/activist

Surname
Clement Daniel Rockey (1889–1975), bishop of the Methodist Church, elected in 1941
Keller E. Rockey (1888–1970), highly decorated Lieutenant General in the United States Marine Corps
Sally Rockey (born 1958), the inaugural Executive Director of the Foundation for Food and Agriculture Research

See also
Dr. A. E. and Phila Jane Rockey House, also known as Rockholm, in the outskirts of Portland, Oregon
Rockey's Air Strip, an airport located in Indiana, United States
Rockeye, an album by the British band The Outfield
Mk-20 Rockeye II clusterbomb
Rock (disambiguation)
Rocky (disambiguation)
Rockies (disambiguation)